Tanzanite University(TC) is a private university in Chamanzi, Tanzania.

References

External links
Official Website

Private universities in Tanzania
Year of establishment missing